Polyptychus anochus is a moth of the family Sphingidae. It is found from Sierra Leone to Nigeria and the Congo.

The wingspan is 30–33 mm.

Subspecies
Polyptychus anochus anochus
Polyptychus anochus margo Pierre & Basquin, 2005 (Central African Republic)

References

Polyptychus
Moths described in 1906
Moths of Africa
Insects of the Democratic Republic of the Congo
Insects of West Africa
Fauna of the Central African Republic
Fauna of Gabon